Thomas Cooper Gotch or T. C. Gotch (1854–1931) was an English painter and book illustrator loosely associated with the Pre-Raphaelite movement; he was the brother of John Alfred Gotch, the architect.

Gotch studied art in London and Antwerp before he married and studied in Paris with his wife, Caroline, a fellow artist. Returning to Britain, they settled into the Newlyn art colony in Cornwall. He first made paintings of natural, pastoral settings before immersing himself in the romantic, Pre-Raphaelite romantic style for which he is best known. His daughter was often a model for the colourful depictions of young girls.

His works have been exhibited at the Royal Academy, Royal College of Art and the Paris Salon.

Personal life
Thomas Gotch was born 10 December 1854 in the Mission House in Kettering, Northamptonshire. He was the fourth son born to Mary Ann Gale Gotch and Thomas Henry Gotch (born 1805), who was a shoe maker. He had an elder brother, John Alfred Gotch, who was a successful architect and author.

In 1881 he married fellow art student Caroline Burland Yates (1854–1945) at Newlyn's St Peter's Church. His daughter, Phyllis Marion Gotch was sometimes a model for her father. After completing his studies, Gotch travelled to Australia in 1883. Gotch and his wife settled in Newlyn, Cornwall in 1887. The couple and their daughter were key participants in the Newlyn art colony.

In addition to his time spent in France and Belgium while studying art, Gotch also travelled to Austria, Australia, South Africa, Italy and Denmark.

Thomas Cooper Gotch died on 1 May 1931 of a heart attack while in London for an exhibition. He was buried in Sancreed churchyard in Cornwall.

Education
With his parents' support, in 1876 and 1877 he first studied at Heatherley's art school in London and then at Koninklijke Academie voor Schone Kunsten in Antwerp in 1877 and 1878. Then in 1879 Gotch attended Slade School of Fine Art with Alphonse Legros in London. Gotch met his friend Henry Scott Tuke and his future wife Caroline Yates at Slade. After their marriage, Thomas and Caroline studied in Paris at Académie Julian and Académie Laurens in the early 1880s. It was in Paris that he adopted the plein-air approach of painting outdoors.

Career
In Newlyn he founded the Newlyn Industrial Classes, where the local youth could learn the arts & crafts. He also helped to set up the Newlyn Art Gallery, and served on its committee all his life.  Among his friends in Newlyn was fellow artist Stanhope Forbes and Albert Chevallier Tayler.

In Newlyn, like other art colony artists, he used the plein-air approach for making paintings outdoors. He was also inspired by James McNeill Whistler's techniques for creating compositions and paintings.

His style changed following an 1891-1892 a visit to Paris and Florence; His works were transformed from the Newlyn "rural realistic" style to a Pre-Raphaelite style that embraced more vibrant, exuberant colours and "returned to allegorical genre painting". His first such painting was My Crown and Sceptre made in 1892, Commenting upon his new style, Tate said:
His new combination of symbolic female figures, decorative Italian textiles and the static order of early Renaissance art finally brought him recognition.

On the provisional committee for the 1895 opening of the Newlyn Art Gallery, Gotch exhibited The Reading Hour and A Golden Dream at the inaugural exhibition.

Chris Leuchars for Project Kettering has said of Gotch's work:
Although Thomas Gotch is not widely recognised in international art histories, his position and friendships in Newlyn, and the mastery of his artwork, provide him some level of recognition in British painting history and his works make valuable contributions to collections around the world. He has work in key collections in Australia, New Zealand, South Africa and the United Kingdom.

Thomas Gotch was a recognised success during his lifetime and enjoyed considerable public acclaim. He was a regular exhibitor at London's Royal Academy and contributed to numerous other national and international exhibitions. His works are still regularly exhibited and are often the subject of academic studies.

Over his artistic career Gotch was also a model for other artists. For instance, he modelled for illustrations of King Arthur's Wood for Elizabeth Forbes.

Memberships
He helped establish, was a prominent force or member of the following organizations. 

 
 New English Art Club (NEAC) - founding member
 Newlyn Industrial Classes - founder
 Newlyn Art Gallery - Committee member
 Newlyn Society of Artists (NSA), Newlyn, Cornwall - from 1895, chairman from 1924 to 1931
 
 Royal British Colonial Society of Artists (RBC) - founding member and President between 1913 and 1928
 Royal Institute of Painters in Water Colours (RI)
 Royal Society of British Artists (RBA)
 Royal West of England Academy (RWA)

Exhibitions
The following had exhibitions of Gotch's work:

During his life:
 1880 +: Royal Academy
 1888: An Artist of the Newlyn School., Manchester City Art Gallery
 1890: Dowdeswells
 1894: Nottingham
 1895: Opening exhibition and thereafter for the Newlyn Art Gallery.
 1896: Won a gold medal at the Berlin Exhibition.
 1902: Whitechapel
 1910: Newcastle retrospective show
 He also exhibited at Paris Salon.

Following his death
 1958: Newlyn Society of Artists, Truro
 1979: Artists of the Newlyn School
 1987: Newlyn Art Gallery
 1987: Royal College of Art
 1992: Artists from Cornwall Exhibit, RWE, Bristol
 2001: T. C. Gotch: The Last of the Pre-Raphaelites, Royal Cornwall Museum Exhibition, Truro
 2005: Faces of Cornwall Exhibition at Penlee House, Penzance exhibited Mrs Sherwood Hunter.

Works
Gotch landscapes, portraits and genre works using watercolour, oil and pastels. The following is a partial list of his works. Most of his earnings came from painting portraits, particularly children and women.

 A Garden
 A Golden Dream, 1895. Used for theme for 100th anniversary of Newlyn Art Gallery.
 A Jest
 Alleluia, 1896, Tate Gallery. Purchased for the nation. One of the best examples of Gotch's Pre-Raphaelite works.
 Blossom (Girl in a Cornish garden)
 Crossing the Bar, 1923
 Dalaphne
 Dawn of Womanhood, 1900
 Death the Bride, 1894/5
 Evening
 Fireside Story
 Girl at Porch, Chywoone Hill, Newlyn, 1889, oil, Penlee House
 Girl in a Cornish Garden, Penlee House
 Harvest
 Heir to All the Ages, 1897
 High Velt, South Africa, 1910
 It is an Ancient Mariner, 1925
 John Alfred Gotch, 1926
 Mental Arithmetic
 Mounts Bay
 Mounts Bay, Autumn, 1905
 Mrs Sherwood Hunter, oil on canvas
 My Crown and Sceptre, 1892. First Pre-Raphaelite style painting.
 Penzance from Newlyn
 Portrait of a girl with eyes closed, charcoal
 Portrait of Phyllis Gotch in Blue, 198?
 Self Portrait, 1912
 Sharing Fish, ca. 1910, Royal Cornwall Museum, Truro
 Sir William Drake in the Morning Room, 1885
 Study of a Young Woman
 Study for 'The Birthday Party
 The Awakening
 The Birthday, 1930
 The Child Enthroned, 1894
 The Clarinet Player
 The Dancing Lesson
 The Exile
 The Flag, 191?
 The Lantern Parade, 1910
 The Madonna of the Mount, 1926
 The Message  1903
 The Mother Enthroned, 1912-1919
 The Nymph, 1920
 The Nymph and The Exile, 1929–30
 The Orchard, 1887, notable early work
 The Pageant of Children, 1895
 The Reading Hour, 1895
 The Return From The Pageant, 1907
 The Sailor's Farewell, oil, Penlee House
 The Story of the Money Pig
 The Vow, 1920s?
 The Wizard, notable early work
 Young Girl Reading a Manuscript

Gallery

Gotch collaborated with John Drew Mackenzie on a set of copper plates that represents air, earth, fire and water, melding the styles of both artists in a symbolic Biblical theme.

Notes

References

Further reading
 Baldry, A. L. "The Work of T. C. Gotch", The Studio, Vol.13, March 1898, pages 73–82.
 Lomax, Pamela. The Golden Dream: A Biography of Thomas Cooper Gotch. Sansom & Company, 2004.
 Lomax, Pamela. A Winter in Florence 1891-1892. Shears & Hogg, 2001
 Lomax, Pamela. A Long Engagement. Shears & Hogg, 2002.
 Virag, Rebecca.Thomas Cooper Gotch: A Painter of Childhood, Motherhood and Empire. Unpublished M.A. thesis, Courtauld Institute of Art, 1997.
 Virag, Rebecca. Images of Inheritance: The influence of eugenic ideas and socio-biological theory in late-nineteenth-century and early-twentieth-century British art (c.1890-1918). Unpublished Ph.D. thesis, Courtauld Institute of Art, 2003.

External links

1854 births
1931 deaths
19th-century English painters
English male painters
20th-century English painters
English illustrators
Members of the Royal West of England Academy
Newlyn School of Artists
People from Kettering
Pre-Raphaelite painters
Pre-Raphaelite illustrators
20th-century English male artists
19th-century English male artists